André Jarich le Fèvre (12 December 1898 – 6 November 1977) was a Dutch association football midfielder. He was included in the Netherlands team that finished fourth for the 1924 Summer Olympics; le Fèvre played five games and scored one goal. That goal was a 77-minute equalizer in the bronze medal match between Sweden and the Netherlands. The match ended in a 1:1 draw, but the Netherlands team lost the replay match 1:3 on the next day.

Between 1921 and 1925 le Fèvre played for SV Kampong. In 1925 he moved to Curaçao and ended his football career.

References

1898 births
1977 deaths
Dutch footballers
Netherlands international footballers
Olympic footballers of the Netherlands
Footballers at the 1924 Summer Olympics
Footballers from Arnhem
Association football midfielders